The flag of São Tomé and Príncipe (Portuguese: bandeira de São Tomé e Príncipe) consists of a red triangle situated at the hoist, with three horizontal green, yellow and green bands charged with two five-pointed black stars of Africa at the centre.  Adopted in 1975 to replace the flag of Portugal from the colonial period, it has been the flag of the Democratic Republic of São Tomé and Príncipe since the country gained independence in that same year.  The design of the present flag was inspired by and is almost identical to the flag of the Movement for the Liberation of São Tomé and Príncipe.

History

The Portuguese colonised the islands of São Tomé and Príncipe during the 16th century and incorporated them into their colonial empire.  Four centuries later, the Batepá massacre in 1953 stoked nationalistic sentiment and galvanized a struggle for independence.  This was led by the Movement for the Liberation of São Tomé and Príncipe (MLSTP), which were established seven years later.  The Portuguese, however, refused to grant this and continued to fight on until the Carnation Revolution occurred in 1974.  The new government decided to withdraw from their remaining colonies, and negotiated on a roadmap for independence with the MLSTP, whom they had recognized as the "sole representative" of the islands.  Several submissions for a new flag were made, all of which utilized the colours of the Pan-Africanist movement.  These were all turned down, and a new flag – reportedly designed by MLSTP leader and future president Manuel Pinto da Costa – was approved of.  It was adopted either on 12 July 1975 – the day the country became independent – or on 5 November of that same year.  The flag is almost identical to the flag of the MLSTP, and although they lost their "monopoly of power" in 1990, the flag remained unchanged.

1974 proposals

Design

Symbolism
The colours and symbols of the flag carry cultural, political, and regional meanings. The green alludes to the plentiful vegetation of the country, while the yellow stands for the tropical sun and cocoa, a key agricultural crop for the nation. The red evokes the "struggle for independence", as well as equality.  The two black stars on the yellow band represent the two islands that make up the country.

Nationally, the flag was inspired by the MLSTP flag; it is almost identical to it except that the widths of the horizontal bands on the national flag are at a ratio of 2:3:2. On the other hand, the three bands on the flag of the political party are of equal width. On a continental level, the yellow, green and red represented the Pan-Africanist movement.  These colours are the same as the ones utilized in the flag of Ethiopia.

Similarities
The national flag is similar to the flags of the Arab Revolt, The Bahamas, Comoros, Ghana and Togo, in its incorporation of the colour red, along with its symbolism of the fight for independence.

Historical Flags

Legal issues
The Santomean flag is often used as a flag of convenience by foreign merchant vessels.  The country's government permits this in order to increase revenue for the country, which does not earn enough from exports or tourism.  In 2002, there were 39 sizeable ships using the flag, despite the fact that São Tomé and Príncipe does not have any deep-water ports.  The lack of regulation has led to "irregularities", and has resulted in the flag being placed on the blacklist for poor port State control.  It was removed from the list in 2004, but only because of a lack of investigations being conducted on ships featuring the country's flag.

References

External links

Sao Tome And Principe
Flag
Flags of Africa
National flags